Italy competed at the 2022 Winter Olympics in Beijing, China, from 4 to 20 February 2022. With Milan-Cortina d'Ampezzo being the host of the 2026 Winter Olympics, an Italian segment was performed at the closing ceremony.

Competitors

The following is the list of number of competitors participating at the Games per sport.

Medalists

The following Italian competitors won medals at the games. In the discipline sections below, the medalists' names are bolded.

Alpine skiing

Italy qualified seven male and nine female alpine skiers.

Men

Women

Mixed

Biathlon

Men

Women

Mixed

Bobsleigh

* – Denotes the driver of each sled

Cross-country skiing

Italy has qualified six male and six female cross-country skiers.

Distance
Men

Women

Sprint

Curling

Summary

Men's tournament

Italy has qualified their men's team (five athletes), by finishing second in the 2021 Olympic Qualification Event.

Round robin
Italy had a bye in draws 1, 4 and 9.

Draw 2
Thursday, 10 February, 14:05

Draw 3
Friday, 11 February, 9:05

Draw 5
Saturday, 12 February, 14:05

Draw 6
Sunday, 13 February, 9:05

Draw 7
Sunday, 13 February, 20:05

Draw 8
Monday, 14 February, 14:05

Draw 10
Tuesday, 15 February, 20:05

Draw 11
Wednesday, 16 February, 14:05

Draw 12
Thursday, 17 February, 9:05

Mixed doubles tournament

Italy has qualified their mixed doubles team (two athletes), by finishing in the top seven teams in the 2021 World Mixed Doubles Curling Championship.

Round robin
Italy had a bye in draws 1, 4, 7 and 10.

Draw 2
Thursday, 3 February, 9:05

Draw 3
Thursday, 3 February, 14:05

Draw 5
Friday, 4 February, 8:35

Draw 6
Friday, 4 February, 13:35

Draw 8
Saturday, 5 February, 14:05

Draw 9
Saturday, 5 February, 20:05

Draw 11
Sunday, 6 February, 14:05

Draw 12
Sunday, 6 February, 20:05

Draw 13
Monday, 7 February, 9:05

Semifinal
Monday, 7 February, 20:05

Final
Tuesday, 8 February, 20:05

Figure skating

In the 2021 World Figure Skating Championships in Stockholm, Sweden, Italy secured two quota in both the men's and pairs competitions, and one quota in the ice dance competition.

Singles

Team event

Freestyle Skiing

Freeski

Ski cross

Luge

Men

 Women

Mixed

Nordic combined

Short track speed skating 

Italy has qualified the maximum five male and five female athletes and will participate in the men's, women's, and mixed relays.

Men

Women

Mixed

Skeleton

Ski jumping 

Men

Women

Snowboarding

Freestyle

Parallel

Snowboard cross

Speed skating

Men

Women

Mass start

Team Pursuit

See also
Italy at the 2022 Winter Paralympics

References

Nations at the 2022 Winter Olympics
2022
Winter Olympics